Samailpur  is a village in Kapurthala district of Punjab State, India. The village is administrated by a Sarpanch who is an elected representative of village as per the constitution of India and Panchayati raj (India).

Demography 
According to the report published by Census India in 2011, Samailpur has 19 houses with total population of 92 persons of which 50 are male and 42 females. Literacy rate of Samailpur is 76.19%, higher than the state average of 75.84%.  The population of children in the age group 0–6 years is 8 which is  8.70% of total population. Child sex ratio is approximately 1667, higher than the state average of 846.

Population data

References

External links
  Villages in Kapurthala
 Kapurthala Villages List

Villages in Kapurthala district